is a Japanese professional footballer who plays as a midfielder for J.League club Omiya Ardija.

Club statistics
Updated to end of 2018 season.

References

External links
Profile at Omiya Ardija

1993 births
Living people
Association football people from Chiba Prefecture
Japanese footballers
J1 League players
J2 League players
J3 League players
Ventforet Kofu players
SC Sagamihara players
Renofa Yamaguchi FC players
Shonan Bellmare players
Omiya Ardija players
Association football midfielders